Feza Publications Inc. (Feza Gazetecilik A.Ş) was a Turkish media conglomerate established in 1986. It had the ownership over the Zaman, Today's Zaman newspapers, the Cihan News Agency, as well as the Aksiyon, news magazine, the book publisher Zaman Kitap and Irmak TV channel. Feza Media Group was ranked 244th in top 500 companies in Turkey according to Istanbul Chamber of Industry's ISO500.

The company was associated with the Gulen movement, whose members became victims of Erdogan government's oppression since 2013 All of its media outlets in Turkey were closed by the government following the 2016 coup attempt.

Staff
Chief Executive Officers were Ekrem Dumanlı(2002-2015) and Abdulhamit Bilici(2015-2016)

Editors were Veysel Ayhan and Ali Akkuş. Social Media Editor was Salih Sarıkaya.

Properties

Newspaper
 Zaman Newspaper
 Today's Zaman

Television 
 Irmak TV
 Cihan Network TV

Radio 
 Radyo Cihan

Magazine 
 Aksiyon
 Turkish Review
 Cihan Dergi

News Agency 
 Cihan News Agency

References

External links
 Zaman 
 Aksiyon
 Cihan News Agency
 Turkish Review

Mass media companies of Turkey
Conglomerate companies of Turkey
Book publishing companies of Turkey
Magazine publishing companies of Turkey
Newspaper companies of Turkey
Companies based in Istanbul
Holding companies established in 1986
Mass media companies established in 1986
Mass media companies disestablished in 2016
Turkish companies established in 1986
2016 disestablishments in Turkey
Holding companies disestablished in 2016